Saeed is a Canadian dramatic short film, directed by Mehra Meh and released in 1991. The film centres on the difficulties faced by an Iranian refugee as he tries to integrate into Canadian society.

The film won the Genie Award for Best Theatrical Short Film at the 12th Genie Awards in 1991.

References

External links
 

1991 films
1991 drama films
Best Theatrical Short Film Genie and Canadian Screen Award winners
1991 short films
1990s English-language films
Canadian drama short films
1990s Canadian films